Ving may refer to:
Ving Rhames (born 1959), American actor
Ving'hawe, administrative ward in the Mpwapwa district of the Dodoma Region of Tanzania
Lee Ving (born Lee James Capalero in 1949), lead singer of the 1980s punk band Fear
Star-ving, web series of eight to ten minutes episodes surrounding the life of David Faustino from Married with Children

See also 
Vinge, a surname